is a Japanese football player currently playing for Azul Claro Numazu.

Career
After firstly going through Júbilo Iwata youth ranks and then attending the football team of Kansai University, Suzuki joined Kamatamare Sanuki in December 2017.

Club statistics
Updated to 29 August 2018.

References

External links

Profile at J. League
Profile at Kamatamare Sanuki

1996 births
Living people
Association football people from Shizuoka Prefecture
Japanese footballers
J2 League players
J3 League players
Kamatamare Sanuki players
Azul Claro Numazu players
Association football midfielders